James Libero Prestini (January 13, 1908 – July 26, 1993) was an American sculptor, designer and woodworker.

Early life and education 
He was born on January 13, 1908, in Waterford, Connecticut. He graduated as a mechanical engineer from Yale University in 1930. In 1933 he began teaching mathematics at Lake Forest Academy.

Career 
James held the post of professor of design at the University of California, Berkeley from 1956 to 1975. He was known for his art of crafting wood into thin bowls and platters, having qualities similar to that of glass or ceramics. He made over 400 sculptures throughout his career. His work is held in the collections of the Smithsonian American Art Museum, the Museum of Modern Art and the Art Institute of Chicago.

Death 
He died of heart failure on July 26, 1993.

References 

1908 births
1993 deaths
20th-century American sculptors
20th-century American male artists
American woodworkers
People from Waterford, Connecticut
American male sculptors
University of California, Berkeley faculty
Yale University alumni
American designers
Sculptors from Connecticut
Lake Forest Academy
Schoolteachers from Connecticut
Schoolteachers from Illinois
Sculptors from California